Kenneth Colin Irving,  (March 14, 1899 – December 13, 1992) was a Canadian businessman whose business began with a family sawmill in Bouctouche, N.B., in 1882. In 1989, he was made an Officer of the Order of Canada.

Biography

Early life
Born in Bouctouche, New Brunswick, his father was prominent local business person James Dergavel Irving (colloquially known by his initials "J.D.").   As a youngster, K.C. Irving was viewed as a tough kid from a rough sawmill town on the Northumberland Strait. He began his entrepreneurial streak early, but this was tempered by the dawn of World War I. Irving, along with several friends attempted to enlist but his father put an end to it by enrolling him at Acadia University. Irving left Acadia before graduation and took a cross-country adventure to British Columbia before returning to Bouctouche. His father did not oppose his second attempt to enlist and Irving entered the Royal Flying Corps in order to train to become a pilot, although he never saw action as the war ended shortly thereafter.

Early twenties
Following the war, he returned home to Bouctouche where he dabbled in the merchant trade, and started to sell Ford automobiles, aged 22; within two years, the sales territory of southern Kent County was his. In 1924, he opened a petrol (gasoline) station under the Imperial Oil logo. He was unceremoniously dumped from that franchise within the year, whereupon he contacted Samuel Lloyd Noble in order to purchase a supply from him. By 1925 he opened a second service station in nearby Shediac. Through hard work and persistence, he would eventually transform what became known as Irving Oil into a 3,000 franchise distributor across the Maritimes.

Early Saint John years

At the age of 26, Irving was invited by the representative of Ford to take over the franchise in Saint John, the city he would make his home for the next 46 years. Early on, he switched his business to the Bank of Nova Scotia as the result of a fortuitous visit which acquainted him with the future president of the bank, Horace L. Enman. In 1926, he was awarded a Ford franchise in Halifax, and the concession for Ford tractors in the whole of the Maritimes. In 1929, he formed K.C. Irving Gas and Oil Ltd, in order to distribute the Noble supply. Haymarket Square Service Stations was formed in the late 1920s as a partnership with two others, one of whom he bought out after the first year. By 1930, Irving was selling petrol in Saint John, Bouctouche, Shediac, Moncton, Sussex, Campbellton, St. Stephen, Westville, Weymouth, Amherst and Truro. Also by 1930, his petrol business expanded into Prince Edward Island and Quebec's Magdalen Islands. In 1930, he sold 8,000,000 gallons, when one of his average service stations sold 70,000 gallons; that year, he employed 212 people in Saint John and 482 elsewhere. Irving saw that the petrol business was also an opportunity to purchase land, and in 1931 erected as his headquarters the Golden Ball building at the corner of Sydney and Union streets.

The '30s
Canada Veneers had been established in 1933 by Robert McMillan, chiefly to produce orange crates for another local company. In 1936, Irving underwrote $100,000 in Canada Veneer preferred shares with Frank Brennan as partners in Irving-Brennan Co. Ltd. Then in the same year, the veneer plant, which had occupied a defunct local horse race-track, burnt down. It revived, but in early January 1938 a shareholder withdrew his guarantee of a $17,000 bank loan, and in exchange for his guarantee of a $10,000 bank loan Irving gained control of the veneer firm. Irving later hired C.A. Kessler to teach his staff, in particular Art McNair, to cut thin and uniform plies, which would become a specialty of the firm.

By 1939 Irving had developed an ulcer, and tipped the scales at 215 pounds; the Lahey Clinic in Boston would in 1941 cure the ulcer.

WW2
Irving obtained the contract from Ottawa or London to build in Bouctouche wooden landing barges for D-Day. He set up the production facilities near the familial grist mill, and built bunkhouses on the family farm for the scores of workers.

1963 Irving refinery strike

After joining the Oil, Chemical and Atomic Workers International Union in 1960, 145 Saint John Irving oil refinery workers pushed for the prevailing wage rate at Canadian oil refineries. The Irving refinery had high productivity but relatively low wages for the sector. Irving's counter-offer was below the wage-rate, leading to a strike in September 1963. The strikers called for a boycott of Irving gas stations, which gained some public support. Irving secured a court injunction against pickets at the gas stations and other secondary pickets. At least a dozen Irving truck driver depots in Quebec struck in sympathy with the refinery workers. On one march through downtown Saint John, refinery workers also burned K.C. Irving in effigy.

The strike became a national issue. The union appealed for donations from across the country, asking Canadians "Are you going to allow that a group of workers be slaughtered by an employer whose trade union notions are those of feudalism?" In addition to court injunctions limiting pickets at the refinery as well as banning secondary pickets at other Irving facilities, Irving also hired replacement workers or scabs. When a settlement was finally achieved in March 1964, Irving conceded wage increases masquerading as "merit pay" while a judge ruled the union pay Irving $2,000 for damaging his reputation.

Offshore holdings

Irving fought many battles with the federal government over income tax, business tax and inheritance tax policies. On 23 December 1971, following a particularly tough series of battles, he left Canada, ostensibly because of the estate tax situation: the Federal government planned to abolish estate taxes while the government of Premier Richard Hatfield (along with the other Maritime governments) planned to introduce an estate tax in its place. Although he remained as majority shareholder, his sons controlled the daily operations of the conglomerate.

From 1972 until his death, Irving would visit New Brunswick for "6 months, less a day" each year.  In 2018 Forbes magazine estimated that the Irving’s net worth was $US12 billion.

Later life and death
K.C. Irving died at home in Saint John and was buried alongside his first wife in Bermuda. Later, his body was exhumed, along with his wife's. They were re-buried outside the Scottish-style church on the Irving Manor in Bouctouche. Their graves were only marked as "Grammy and Grampy".

Legacy
In 1927, Irving married Harriet McNairn (1899–1976), a boyhood sweetheart, and the following year his first son was born. He was the father of, in 1928 James Kenneth, in 1930 Arthur Lee, and in 1932 John Ernest; the family attended St John's and St Stephen's Presbyterian Church. Irving would, after his sons all had graduated, provide for a new building at Rothesay Collegiate School.

Ownership and operation of the Irving group of companies ultimately divided among his three sons and their respective children, James, the oldest brother and his (James') two sons, Jim and Robert, took more control of forest products and several other divisions, Arthur the middle brother assumed more autonomy in Irving Oil, which owns the Saint John, New Brunswick Irving Oil Refinery, Canada's largest refinery, and Jack who looked after much of the construction, engineering and Radio & Television stations.

The family has long maintained their secrecy while actively supporting many community initiatives. Their philanthropy has long been rumoured in many projects, but the first time it was publicly acknowledged was during the early years of the Université de Moncton, an institution that Irving came to support in recognition of the support that members of the Acadian community had given to his companies.

Corporate inventions
Acquisitions are listed in italic print.

Criticism

J.D. Irving Limited

It was the growth of Irving Oil which largely financed K.C. Irving's other endeavours. Several years after starting Irving Oil, Irving took over his father's sawmill company in Bouctouche, J.D. Irving Limited, which was subsequently expanded many times.  JDI was in the 1970s the largest single landowner in New Brunswick, Nova Scotia and Maine. JDI has also been identified as being one of the four largest private land-owners in the United States. These forest lands feed several pulp and paper plants and sawmills which in turn feed the company's paper, tissue, and diaper factories throughout New Brunswick, Nova Scotia, Maine, New York, Georgia, Quebec and Ontario.

Diversification and vertical integration
As the Irving industrial empire expanded during World War II and the post-war era, K.C. Irving purchased shipyards and started various food processing, media, hardware, building supplies, transportation, engineering and construction companies - all of which are vertically integrated, meaning that each Irving company purchases the services of other Irving companies, keeping profits wholly within the conglomerate.

Irving companies are completely privately owned, and therefore all major business decisions are made by the family-members/owners. This has traditionally been a weakness among many family-owned empires. However, the Irvings have proven their ability to react to market situations much more quickly than their publicly traded competitors , a primary reason for their maintaining market share in so many industries throughout northeastern North America.  An example can be seen in the fact that Irving Oil undertook significant upgrades and expansions to its refinery in the late mid to late 1990s to produce low-sulphur gasoline, fully a decade ahead of the rest of the North American oil industry. As a result, Irving has been able to capitalize on the growing need for low-emission fuel in California and other U.S. markets (delivered by its own ships).

The conglomerate operates with considerable latitude which the Irving family's wealth permits—operating somewhat as a maverick to the consternation of many of Central and Western Canada's business leaders. Irving Oil, J.D. Irving and all subsidiary companies are actively supporting Canada's ratification and implementation of the Kyoto Protocol, since the family has invested considerable funds into environmental controls and alternative energy for its operations and wishes to capitalize on these investments at the expense of its slow-to-respond publicly traded competitors.  J.D. Irving's food processing plants in Prince Edward Island are looking to build one of the largest wind farms in Canada in that province to completely power their operations, and many Irving-owned sawmills and factories in the rest of northeastern North America are rapidly adopting co-generation, bio-gas and solar/wind power to complement current energy usage.

The Irving family is also hoping to take advantage of deregulation of utility markets in the region by building natural gas-fired electrical generating stations and is currently building a liquified natural gas terminal near its Saint John refinery.

New Brunswick Media Concentration 
The Irvings have an almost complete monopoly in print media in New Brunswick, owning all English and French daily newspapers but one (L'Acadie Nouvelle) and most English weekly and community papers. In the 1970s, when this concentration was limited to only four English daily newspapers, the Senate created a commission of inquiry into media concentration because of the Irving family's control. Today print media across Canada has experienced a much higher degree of concentration than existed with Irving in New Brunswick during the 1970s, and the case with Irving was one of the first in the nation. The Irving family ostensibly allows their media holdings to operate relatively independently with the only oversight supposedly being in their finances.

The grandson of J.K. Irving and son of Jim Irving, Jamie Irving became publisher of the Irving-owned New Brunswick Telegraph-Journal then vice-president of the newspaper holding company.

Irving did have a near monopoly in media in New Brunswick well into the 1980s when they owned several English radio stations and CHSJ-TV, the only CBC affiliate in the province. Irving also started MITV (Maritime Independent Television) as a competitor across the Maritimes with the ATV network. The CBC affiliate was sold to the public broadcaster in 1994 at the same time as MITV was sold to CanWest Global.

Irving family wealth
According to the 2011 list of Canadians by net worth the combined net worth of the Irving family ranked third in Canada calculated with the net worth of Arthur Irving, James Irving and John Irving through Irving Oil Ltd. and J.D. Irving Ltd at $8.07 billion with no change from 2010. In 2008 the Canadian Business magazine's annual report on the wealthiest Canadians calculated that the Irving family combined wealth rose 34 percent from 2007 to $US 7.11 billion. Only the Thompson family, with a net worth is US$18.45 billion, were wealthier  However, since the conglomerate is privately held and the family is private with respect to financial matters, no information on net worth is available. Most observers have only the tangible values of real property and industrial assets upon which to base their estimates without any ability to assess the value of cash reserves or outstanding debt and obligations.

Despite Forbes's estimates, the overall Irving family fortune is likely to be grossly underestimated because of complex tax avoiding schemes which blur evidence behind a network of number companies and international holdings. In 1981, the National Film Board movie "I Like to See Wheels Turn" mentioned Canadian Lawyer Peter Glennie's findings. Glennie had compiled company registrations and the rare public documents on the Irving wealth. His estimations on the Irving family wealth were 7 billion in 1981 Canadian dollars (worth 22 billion in 2019 inflation-adjusted Canadian dollars).

Notes

References

See also 
Irving Group of Companies

1899 births
1992 deaths
Canadian military personnel of World War I
Businesspeople from New Brunswick
Officers of the Order of Canada
People from Kent County, New Brunswick
Canadian philanthropists
Members of the Order of New Brunswick
Canadian company founders
Canadian newspaper chain founders
People from Bouctouche
Canadian Presbyterians
20th-century philanthropists
Royal Flying Corps personnel
British Army personnel of World War I